Sar Qaleh (also Romanized as Sar Qal‘eh and Sar Qalā) is a village in Mahru Rural District, Zaz va Mahru District, Aligudarz County, Lorestan Province, Iran. At the 2006 census, its population was 199, in 31 families.

References 

Towns and villages in Aligudarz County